Desborough St Giles, representing part of the town of Desborough, is a 2-member ward within Kettering Borough Council. The ward was last fought at Borough Council level in the 2007 local council elections, in which both seats were won by the Conservatives.

Desborough St. Giles Ward is a 2-member ward within Kettering Borough Council located in the north of Desborough, Northamptonshire. The ward was prior to May 2007 formally known as simply St. Giles but, both for sake of clarity and to ensure continuity, this article refers to the ward as "Desborough St. Giles".

The current councillors are Cllr. Mike Tebbutt and Cllr. Dave Soans.

Councillors
Kettering Borough Council Elections 2007
Mike Tebbutt (Conservative)
Dave Soans (Conservative)

Kettering Borough Council Elections 2003
David Coe (Labour)
Mike Tebbutt (Conservative)

Kettering Borough Council Elections 1999
David Coe (Labour)
Richard Tod (Labour)

Current Ward Boundaries (2007-)

Kettering Borough Council Elections 2007
Note: due to boundary changes, vote changes listed below are based on notional results.

Historic Ward Boundaries (1999-2007)

Kettering Borough Council Elections 2003

(Vote count shown is ward average)

Kettering Borough Council Elections 1999
This seat may have been affected by boundary changes at this election.

(Vote count shown is ward average)

See also
Desborough
Kettering Borough Council

Electoral wards in Kettering
Desborough